Homalocalyx pulcherrimus is a member of the family Myrtaceae endemic to Western Australia.

It blooms between September and December producing red-pink-purple flowers.

It is found on sand plains in an area where the Goldfields-Esperance meets the Wheatbelt region of Western Australia between Kondinin and Coolgardie where it grows in sandy soils.

References

pulcherrimus
Endemic flora of Western Australia
Myrtales of Australia
Rosids of Western Australia
Plants described in 1987